Viktor Angelov (born 27 March 1994) is a Macedonian professional footballer who plays as a centre-forward for Liga I club FC Voluntari.

International career
Angelov made his senior debut for Macedonia in a November 2015 friendly match against Lebanon, as of February 2020, his sole international game.

References

External links 

Viktor Angelov at Sofascore

1994 births
Living people
Footballers from Dortmund
German people of Macedonian descent
Association football midfielders
Macedonian footballers
North Macedonia youth international footballers
North Macedonia under-21 international footballers
North Macedonia international footballers
FK Rabotnički players
FK Metalurg Skopje players
Újpest FC players
FK Shkupi players
NK Široki Brijeg players
FC Voluntari players
Macedonian First Football League players
Nemzeti Bajnokság I players
Premier League of Bosnia and Herzegovina players
Liga I players
Macedonian expatriate footballers
Expatriate footballers in Hungary
Macedonian expatriate sportspeople in Hungary
Macedonian expatriate sportspeople in Romania
Expatriate footballers in Bosnia and Herzegovina
Macedonian expatriate sportspeople in Bosnia and Herzegovina
German footballers